Carle Place (also known historically as Frog Hollow and Mineola Park) is a hamlet and census-designated place (CDP) in the Town of North Hempstead in Nassau County, on Long Island, in New York, United States. The CDP's population was 4,981 at the 2010 census.

History
In 1946, developer William J. Levitt bought 19 acres of land near the Carle Place train station for an experiment. His crews brought pre-cut lumber to the site and rapidly assembled 600 low-cost houses, offering affordable suburban living with an easy commute into offices in New York City. Within five years, returning veterans and their families swelled the population by 500 percent. It transformed Carle Place, and served as the prototype for Levittown, the larger development which Levitt began the following year only a few miles away.

The hamlet is named for Silas Carle, or (more specifically) the Carle House - a 32-room house built by Carle in Westbury in the 1800s. It was commonly known as the "Carle Place", and the surrounding area later took the name.

The area was also known as Mineola Park between ca. 1895 and 1915, after an unsuccessful real estate development of the same name within the hamlet. The name was reverted to Carle Place in 1915, and there was only one further attempt to change it, which took place in 1951 after Levitt & Sons purchased and developed much of the area consisting of the unsuccessful development. The proposal failed, as the majority of residents preferred keeping the name, and no attempts to change it have taken place since.

Another historic name for the area is Frog Hollow, which is still used colloquially and is the source of the Carle Place Union Free School District's mascot.

Geography

The villages bordering Carle Place are Mineola, Garden City, and Westbury. Carle Place also borders the part of Uniondale formerly known as East Garden City, an unincorporated area of the Town of Hempstead.

Carle Place's southern border runs along Old Country Road, while its eastern border runs along Carle Road.

The southern border also makes up part of the border between North Hempstead and Hempstead.

Most of the western border runs along the path of the former Long Island Motor Parkway.

Economy 
Carle Place is considered a bedroom community of the City of New York. As such, many residents commute to/from New York for work. The hamlet also consists of areas of varying sizes zoned for commercial, retail, and industrial uses.

Additionally, Carle Place is the headquarters of 1-800 Flowers.

Demographics

2010 Census
As of the 2010 census The make up of the population was 77.9% Non-Hispanic white, 2.1% Black or African American, 7.9% Asian, 3.8% from other races, and 1.9% from two or more races. Hispanic or Latino of any race were 11.1% of the population.

2000 Census
As of the 2000 census, there were 5,247 people, 1,900 households, and 1,371 families residing in the CDP. The population density was 2,155.2/km2 (5,572.9/mi2). The Town is known for being . There were 1,922 housing units at an average density of 789.5/km2 (2,041.4/mi2). The racial makeup of the CDP was 89.88% White, 1.89% African American, 0.02% Native American, 5.45% Asian, 0.02% Pacific Islander, 1.47% from other races, and 1.28% from two or more races. Hispanic or Latino of any race were 7.78% of the population.

There were 1,900 households, out of which 31.7% had children under the age of 18 living with them, 59.8% were married couples living together, 9.5% had a female householder with no husband present, and 27.8% were non-families. 23.9% of all households were made up of individuals, and 10.0% had someone living alone who was 65 years of age or older. The average household size was 2.76 and the average family size was 3.31.

In the CDP, the population was spread out, with 22.8% under the age of 18, 7.6% from 18 to 24, 29.9% from 25 to 44, 24.4% from 45 to 64, and 15.3% who were 65 years of age or older. The median age was 39 years. For every 100 females, there were 91.7 males. For every 100 females age 18 and over, there were 90.7 males.

The median income for a household in the CDP was $70,938, and the median income for a family was $85,240. Males had a median income of $51,744 versus $37,344 for females. The per capita income for the CDP was $31,624. About 3.4% of families and 5.4% of the population were below the poverty line, including 5.1% of those under age 18 and 10.0% of those age 65 or over.

Education 

Carle Place has its own school district, which, though it includes small portions of the villages of Westbury and Mineola, is one of the smallest in New York state. It consists of three schools which adjoin each other on one large campus:  
Cherry Lane School, a primary school serving grades K-2 
Rushmore Avenue School, an elementary school serving grades 3-6
Carle Place Middle School/High School, a secondary school serving grades 7-12
The entirety of Carle Place is located within this district, thus meaning all children who reside within the hamlet and attend public schools go to Carle Place's schools.

Transportation 
The Long Island Rail Road's Carle Place station is located within the hamlet. It is located on the LIRR's Main Line.

Landmark

 St. Mary's Chapel – A historic church within the hamlet listed on the National Register of Historic Places.

Notable people 
 Richard Friesner – Scientist, entrepreneur, and professor at Columbia University, a member of the American Academy of Arts and Sciences, and co-founder of Schrödinger, LLC., a drug discovery tech company.
Brendan Hay – Emmy-nominated TV writer and showrunner.
Matt Snell – Former player with the New York Jets.
Richard Staff – Baseball writer.
Steve Vai – Guitarist.

References

External links 

 Westbury–Carle Place Chamber of Commerce website
Carle Place Union Free School District

 
Hamlets in New York (state)
Census-designated places in New York (state)
Census-designated places in Nassau County, New York
Hamlets in Nassau County, New York